Augsburg-Hochzoll station is a station in the Hochzoll district east of central Augsburg in the German state of Bavaria. Directly west of the station the Paar Valley Railway separates from the Munich–Augsburg railway running from Augsburg Central Station (Hauptbahnhof). It is classified by Deutsche Bahn as a category 3 station.

Infrastructure 

Hochzoll station takes an unusual form: since it is located immediately after the tracks towards Munich or Ingolstadt separate, the platforms on the two lines are somewhat separated: platform tracks 5 and 6 are located on the Paar Valley line with the platforms on the outside of the tracks, while platform tracks 3 and 4 in contrast are on a central platform on the Munich–Augsburg line. There is no platform on tracks 1 and 2 of the Munich–Augsburg line. These tracks are now only used for non-stopping passenger services and freight traffic.

The station building, which lies between track 4 and 5, used to have a ticket office that was open on weekdays and ticket machines. The ticket office is now closed and the ticket machines have been relocated on the newly built platforms.

Bahnhof Augsburg-Hochzoll bus stop is located on Hochzoller Straße, which runs under the two sets of tracks east of the station building.  It is served by city bus route 29 and has a kiosk, where tickets for regional transport can be obtained.  The kiosk is accommodated temporarily in a container. It has not been determined whether the operator will receive a new building or even be installed in the station building, which is not used for rail purposes.

A Bike&Ride facility with about 256 covered bicycle parking places was erected between November 2007 and April 2008.

Services

The station is served by all Regionalbahn and Regional-Express services that leave Augsburg Central Station to the east and then run via Aichach to Ingolstadt or via Mering to Munich. The odd layout of the station means that there is some distance between some platforms. Long-distance traffic does not stop at Augsburg-Hochzoll.

Augsburg-Hochzoll is located in the fare zone of the Augsburger Verkehrsverbund (Augsburg Transport Association, AVV). Within of the AVV, the regional train lines have their own line designations. Hochzoll station is therefore served by the Regional line R1  on the route to Munich as far as Mammendorf, by line R2  on the route to Ingolstadt as far as Radersdorf and by line R11 on the route to Weilheim as far as Schmiechen.

Between tracks 1 and 5 there is a bus stop used by city buses on route 29, which runs only on weekdays (in the peak hour every 10 minutes). About 250 metres north of the station along Hochzoller Straße there is a bus and tram stop called Hochzoll Mitte on Friedberger Straße, which is served by city bus line 29 and tram line 6.

Current and future reconstruction

The station was completely rebuilt during the upgrading  of the Munich–Augsburg line as the Munich-Augsburg high speed line and as part of the Magistrale for Europe.

The platforms of the Paar Valley Railway, which had been built at the level of the station building were replaced by two 76 cm high platforms on the bridge over Hochzoller Straße in 2002.

The tracks and the two platforms towards Mering, Munich and Weilheim were replaced from 2000 to 2007 by two through tracks for long-distance traffic and two additional tracks with an island platform for regional traffic. The new island platform for tracks 3 and 4 has been in operation since 16 September 2007.

A further increase in its importance has occurred due to the S-Bahn-like schedule of the Augsburg region clock-face timetable. The station is receiving a growing importance for commuters to central Augsburg mainly as a result of its numerous services: Bayerische Regiobahn services operate to and from Friedberg or Aichach (continuing to Ingolstadt once an hour) every 15 minutes all day. To and from Mering, Bayerische Regiobahn services also alternate with DB Regio services, providing a service every 15 minutes in the peak hour, so that at these times there are services every 7.5-minutes into and out of the city.

Notes

Hochzoll